Haines Township may refer to the following townships in the United States:

 Haines Township, Centre County, Pennsylvania
 Haines Township, Marion County, Illinois